William Trewartha Bray (1 June 1794 – 25 May 1868), known as Billy Bray, was an unconventional Cornish preacher.

Biography
Billy Bray was born in 1794 in the village of Twelveheads, Cornwall, England, UK. He was the eldest of three children born to William Bray, who was a miner, and his wife Ann, who came from Gwennap. William Bray died when his children were young and they were cared for by their grandfather, who was a pious Methodist. After leaving school, Billy Bray worked as a miner in Cornwall and for seven years in Devon; during this time he was a drunkard and was prone to riotous behaviour. In 1821 he married Joanna, who was a lapsed Methodist and they eventually had seven children.

In 1823 he had a close escape from a mining accident, and later said that he was converted in November of that year through reading John Bunyan's Visions of Heaven and Hell. He became attached to a group of Methodists known as the Bible Christians, and became a well-known but unconventional preacher; his sermons being enlivened by spontaneous outbursts of singing and dancing. Bray did not restrict his activities to preaching, raising two orphans along with his own children and generously giving help to other people. He also raised enough funds to build three new Methodist chapels, one in his home village of Twelveheads, one at Carharrack, and one—nicknamed 'Three Eyes' chapel because of its three windows—at nearby Kerley Downs.

Bray died in 1868 and is buried at the parish church of Saint Michael and All Angels in Baldhu where his grave is marked by a granite obelisk. In 1984 the 'Three Eyes' chapel, the only one of the three he built that is still standing, was dedicated to his memory.

Legacy
F. W. Bourne wrote a biography of Bray entitled A King's Son which, after its first publication in 1871, went through many editions under several titles for over a hundred years. According to this biography one of Bray's favourite sayings, which he used when people complained about his enthusiastic singing and shouting, was

William James referred to Bray as "an excellent little illiterate English evangelist" in his The Varieties of Religious Experience published in 1902. Annie Dillard makes reference to Bray in the last sentence of her 1974 Pulitzer Prize-winning Pilgrim at Tinker Creek. Billy Bray in His Own Words by Chris Wright was published in 2004; it is based on the previously unpublished journal of Bray written in his own handwriting, that had lain untouched since the nineteenth century. Bray's life was celebrated by the Devon folk songwriter Seth Lakeman in the song "Preacher's Ghost" on his 2010 album Hearts and Minds.

Michael Bentley has written a children's book about him that was published in 2012.

Notes

References

1794 births
1868 deaths
Converts to Methodism
Cornish Methodists
Cornish evangelicals
People from Chacewater